Local elections were held in  San Jose del Monte, Bulacan on May 13, 2019 within the Philippine general election. The voters will elect for the elective local posts in the city: the congressman, the mayor, vice mayor, and six councilors in two districts.

Background

Incumbent congresswoman Rida Robes is running for her second term under the banner of the PDP–Laban. Her opponent is incumbent councilor Irene del Rosario. Incumbent mayor Arthur Robes is running for his second term under the banner of his own party, Arangkada San Joseño. His opponent is former mayor Reynaldo San Pedro, who is running under the PFP.

Results

Representative
Incumbent Congresswoman Florida Robes is running for her second term against incumbent councilor Irene del Rosario.

Mayor
Incumbent Mayor Arthur Robes is running for his second term against former City Mayor Reynaldo San Pedro.

Vice Mayor
Incumbent Vice Mayor Efren Bartolome Jr. is running for his second term unopposed.

Sangguniang Panlungsod election
Election is via plurality-at-large voting: A voter votes for up to six candidates, then the six candidates with the highest number of votes are elected.

In the first district, incumbent councilors Richie Robes and Joey Abela is running for their third terms, while Noli Concepcion, Glenn Villano, Liezl Aguirre, and Ryan Santos is running for their second terms. In the second district, Benjie Acibal and Reypol Policarpio is running for their third terms, while Ryan Elfa and Argel Joseph Drio will run for their second terms. Incumbent councilor Irene del Rosario ran for the congressional seat while Eumir Samera ran for a board member seat.

1st District

|-bgcolor=black
|colspan=25|

2nd District

|-bgcolor=black
|colspan=25|

References

2019 Philippine local elections
Elections in Bulacan
May 2019 events in the Philippines
2019 elections in Central Luzon